A Touch of Grace is an American sitcom that was based on the British series For the Love of Ada starring Shirley Booth and J. Patrick O'Malley centering on a widow who moves in with her daughter and son-in-law and her romantic relationship with an elderly man. It aired on ABC from January 20 to April 21, 1973.

Cast
Shirley Booth...Grace Simpson
J. Patrick O'Malley...Herbert Morrison
Warren Berlinger...Walter Bradley
Marian Mercer...Myra Bradley

Synopsis
Recently widowed, in her 60s, living off her Social Security checks, and struggling to make a new life for herself, Grace Simpson moves in with her daughter and son-in-law, Myra and Walter Bradley.  Grace is perky and young at heart, in sharp contrast to the stodgy and conservative Myra and Walter, and her presence disrupts their lives. Although Grace dates a lot, her steady boyfriend is Herbert Morrison, who works as a gravedigger. Myra and Walter disapprove of Graces relationship with Herbert.

Production

A Touch of Grace marked the return of Shirley Booth to television after the end of her long and successful run as the star of Hazel from 1961 to 1966, and it was also her last television series. Saul Turteltaub was the executive producer of the show, and Bernie Orenstein produced it. Episode directors included Carl Reiner and Bill Hobin. Writers included Turteltaub, Orenstein, Jeff Harris, Rick Mittleman, Bernie Kukoff, David Pollock, Elias Davis, and George Tibbles.

A Touch of Grace was based on the 1970-1971 British television series For the Love of Ada. It was an unusual show for its time, as it focused on an older couple falling in love at a time when American television networks were relentlessly pursuing a youthful viewership demographic. Critics viewed it as well written and well acted, and a good showcase for Shirley Booths talents.

Broadcast history

A Touch of Grace premiered on ABC on Saturday, January 20, 1973 at 8:30 P.M. It faced tough competition in its time slot from CBSs All in the Family and Bridget Loves Bernie and NBC's Emergency!. The sitcom preceded ABC's highly touted variety show The Julie Andrews Hour, which had just been moved from its Wednesday night 10:00 P.M. time slot to Saturday night at 9:00 P.M. in order to improve upon its marginal ratings. However, Andrews, in turn, had to compete with the highly rated CBS series The Mary Tyler Moore Show and The Bob Newhart Show. As a result, both A Touch of Grace and The Julie Andrews Hour garnered low ratings despite their critical acclaim. ABC cancelled both shows in April, 1973.

ABC broadcast reruns of A Touch of Grace in prime time on Saturday evenings on April 28, 1973, and from May 12 to June 16, 1973.

Episodes
Source:

References

American Broadcasting Company original programming
1973 American television series debuts
1973 American television series endings
1970s American sitcoms
American television series based on British television series
English-language television shows
Television shows set in London